A , also known as a  or , is a Japanese city that has a population greater than 500,000 and has been designated as such by order of the Cabinet of Japan under Article 252, Section 19, of the Local Autonomy Law.

Designated cities are delegated many of the functions normally performed by prefectural governments in fields such as public education, social welfare, sanitation, business licensing, and urban planning. The city government is generally delegated the various minor administrative functions in each area, and the prefectural government retains authority over major decisions. For instance, pharmaceutical retailers and small clinics can be licensed by designated city governments, but pharmacies and hospitals are licensed by prefectural governments.

Designated cities are also required to subdivide themselves into  (broadly equivalent to the boroughs of London or the boroughs of New York City), each of which has a ward office conducting various administrative functions for the city government, such as koseki and juminhyo resident registration and tax collection. In some cities, ward offices are responsible for business licensing, construction permits, and other administrative matters. The structure and the authorities of the wards are determined by municipal ordinances.

The 23 special wards of Tokyo are not part of this system, as Tokyo is a prefecture, and its wards are effectively independent cities. Although the two largest wards of Tokyo, Setagaya and Nerima, are populous enough to become designated cities, they are not considered to be "cities" within the meaning of the Local Autonomy Law and so are not designated as such.

No city designated by government ordinance has ever lost that status.

List of designated cities

Cities designated by government ordinance have been established since 1956.

Designated city requirements 
To become a candidate for designated city status, a city must have a population greater than 500,000. An application for designation is made by a city with the approval of both the city and the prefectural assemblies.

The following cities have populations greater than 500,000 but have not yet been nominated. (Cities planning to apply for core city status are not shown. ※Core Cities, ※※Core cities at risk of dissolving)

History
The first form of the designated city system was enacted under Japan local government system in 1878 with the introduction of "wards." Under that system, wards existed in every city. Most cities had only one ward, but the largest cities at the time (Tokyo, Osaka and Kyoto) were divided into 15, four, and two wards, respectively.

The municipal system enacted in 1889 replaced ward assemblies with city assemblies but retained ward assemblies in Tokyo, Osaka and Kyoto, which had no assembly of their own but were governed by the prefectural assembly. In 1898, the three cities were allowed to form city assemblies. The ward system was adopted by three more cities prior to World War II: Nagoya (1908), Yokohama (1927), and Kobe (1931). Under a 1911 statute, wards were granted a corporate personality and so treated as local entities.

The system was replaced by the designated city system when the Local Autonomy Law was amended, in 1956.

During the ensuing Japanese economic growth period, the government required designated cities to be forecast to reach a population of one million within the near future, but the requirement was dropped in 2005 to accommodate several geographically large cities that were formed by mergers, under the government of Junichiro Koizumi.

See also
 Administrative divisions of Japan
 Urban area

References

External links
 Directory of Designated Cities and Mayors (in English)
  "Japan's Evolving Nested Municipal Hierarchy: The Race for Local Power in the 2000s," by A.J. Jacobs at Urban Studies Research, Vol. 2011 (2011); doi:10.1155/2011/692764
 "Large City System of Japan"; graphic shows designated cities compared with other Japanese city types at p. 1 [PDF 7 of 40]
 "Growth in Second Tier Cities – Urban Policy Lessons from Japan" briefing by CLAIR London on classes of Japanese cities (PDF)
 Text of the Local Government Law 

 
 
Subdivisions of Japan
Law of Japan